Álvaro Rodríguez Melero (born 25 May 1987 in Valladolid) is a Spanish middle distance runner. He represented his country in the 1500 metres at the 2012 Summer Olympics without advancing from the first round.

Achievements

References

1987 births
Living people
Sportspeople from Valladolid
Spanish male middle-distance runners
Athletes (track and field) at the 2012 Summer Olympics
Olympic athletes of Spain
Universiade medalists in athletics (track and field)
Universiade silver medalists for Spain
Medalists at the 2007 Summer Universiade
Athletes (track and field) at the 2009 Mediterranean Games
Mediterranean Games competitors for Spain
21st-century Spanish people